Brabham is a surname. Notable people with the surname include:

Brabham racing family
 Jack Brabham, Australian three-time Formula 1 World Champion
 Geoff Brabham, Australian international Indy car and Sports Car racing driver
 Roseina Brabham, jet ski racing champion, wife of Geoff, mother of Matthew
 Matthew Brabham, Australian/American international racing driver
 Gary Brabham, Australian international racing driver and convicted rapist
 David Brabham, Australian international Formula 1 and Sports Car racing driver
 Lisa Brabham (née Thackwell), racing driver, wife of David, mother of Sam
 Sam Brabham, British racing driver

Other people
 Brenda Brabham, 2005 Miss Pennsylvania USA
 Cary Brabham (born 1970), American-football player
 Danny Brabham (1941–2011), U.S. American-football player
 Doris Brabham Hatt (1890–1969), British artist
 Henry Brabham (1929–2020), founder of the North American ice hockey league ECHL

See also

 
 Brabham (disambiguation)
 Braham (surname)